John M. Prenderville was an American athlete and government official who played and coached basketball at St. Francis Preparatory School and St. Francis College and served as chairman of the New York State Athletic Commission and deputy commissioner of the New York State Office of Parks, Recreation and Historic Preservation.

Athletic career
Prenderville grew up in Park Slope and played basketball St. Francis Preparatory School and St. Francis College. His playing career was interrupted by the Korean War. He served in the United States Army from 1953 to 1955. He was a member of the St. Francis team that made it to the semifinals of the 1956 National Invitation Tournament. He graduated from St. Francis College in 1956.

Coaching career
From 1963 to 1973, Prenderville was the varsity and junior varsity basketball coach at St. Francis Prep. In 1973 he succeeded his former teammate Lester Yellin as the head coach at St. Francis College. In two seasons he compiled a record of 18–32.

Head coaching record

Government service
Prenderville began his career in politics as an assistant to Congressman Hugh L. Carey. Prenderville later ran Carey's Brooklyn office and when Carey became Governor of New York, Prenderville was appointed deputy commissioner of the New York State Office of Parks, Recreation and Historic Preservation. In 1977, Prenderville helped create the Empire State Games. In February 1978 he was named acting chairman of the New York State Athletic Commission. He was promoted to permanent chairman that July. He was replaced by John R. Branca as athletic commission chairman in 1983 but continued to serve as Deputy Commissioner of Parks and Recreation until 1994.

Later life
Prenderville served as president of the American Housing Foundation, which provided affordable rental apartments for the elderly in the Capital Region. He died on October 26, 2019, in Samaritan Hospital in Troy, New York.

References

20th-century births
2019 deaths
New York State Athletic Commissioners
Sportspeople from Albany, New York
Sportspeople from Brooklyn
Basketball players from New York City
St. Francis College alumni
St. Francis Brooklyn Terriers men's basketball coaches
St. Francis Brooklyn Terriers men's basketball players
St. Francis Preparatory School alumni
United States Army personnel of the Korean War